Sadick Abubakar (born 2 February 1998) is a Ghanaian professional footballer who plays as defender for Serbian club Radnički Sremska Mitrovica.

Career
Abubakar played for FK Smederevo 1924 from January 2020 to July 2020. He joined FK Radnički Sremska Mitrovica on 13 July 2020 on a free transfer.

Career statistics

References

External links
 
 PRVA Liga Profile

1998 births
Living people
Ghanaian footballers
Association football defenders
Jönköpings Södra IF players
FK Smederevo players
Serbian First League players
Ghanaian expatriate footballers
Expatriate footballers in Sweden
Ghanaian expatriate sportspeople in Sweden
Expatriate footballers in Serbia
Ghanaian expatriate sportspeople in Serbia